Magod is a small village in South Gujarat in the Valsad district. It has been there for a period of approximately 350 years. It is a fertile area which is heavily used for agriculture.

Magod is also small village of karnataka in southern part of India.

This village is approximately 160km from Mumbai and 100km from Surat. Distance from Valsad railway station is 11km and its approximately 7 km from National High way no 48 Atul. Big chemical complex Atul is less than 6 km from magod

Agriculture 
There are many farms in Magod which are owned by multiple families. Its main source of income is yielded from the production of mangoes. Other subordinate products of income are rice, various vegetables, including tomatoes.

Villages in Valsad district